Lynn University is a private university in Boca Raton, Florida. Founded in 1962, the university awards associate, baccalaureate, master's, and doctoral degrees. It is named for the Lynn family (Christine E. and Eugene M. Lynn). It has a total undergraduate enrollment of 2,640.

History
The school first opened in 1962 as Marymount College, a women's junior college founded by the Religious of the Sacred Heart of Mary (RSHM). Due to financial hardship Marymount College sought to sell the books of its library.  Donald E. Ross visited the campus to purchase the library, but was so inspired by the school he decided to stay and help it succeed.  In 1971, a period of transition began, and the school was placed under the control of a lay board. At that time, Donald E. Ross was named president. In 1974, the name was changed to the College of Boca Raton. The college was granted accreditation at Level II in 1986. In 1988, it was accredited at Level III.  During this time, it was transformed from a two-year school to a four-year college with a master's program.

The College of Boca Raton became Lynn University in 1991 to honor its benefactors, the Lynn family.

In 2003–2004, Donald E. Ross was paid a salary of over $5,000,000, making him at the time the highest-paid college or university president in the nation. Lynn University retained the national accounting firm KPMG to determine an equitable retirement compensation package for Ross considering his performance and 35-year term of service ("More than $4.5 million was put aside for his planned June 2006 retirement – an influx of cash designed to make up for decades of no retirement benefits" being allocated due to budget concerns). This was a third of the endowment for the university. On July 1, 2006, Ross retired after 35 years as the university's president; Kevin M. Ross succeeded his father in office.

On October 22, 2012, the university hosted the third and final 2012 U.S. presidential debate between U.S. president Barack Obama and former Massachusetts governor Mitt Romney concerning U.S. foreign policy.  The debate was held at the Keith C. and Elaine Johnson World Performing Arts Center and was moderated by journalist Bob Schieffer of CBS News.

Academics

Academic programs
Lynn offers an undergraduate and graduate curriculum. Lynn offers more than 40 undergraduate degrees and 14 graduate degrees through its six colleges. Lynn's core curriculum, the Dialogues of Learning, was recognized by Inside Higher Education as an example of how colleges and universities can increase the rigor of their academic offerings and improve the comprehensive education of their students.

Dialogues of Learning 
All undergraduate students at Lynn University complete the core curriculum the Dialogues of Learning.  A cohesive core curriculum, students take 1 class each year, for a total of 4 classes each, in 5 themes: the Dialogues of Justice and Civic Life (DJC), Dialogues of Self and Society (DSS), Dialogues of Belief and Reason (DBR), Dialogues of Quantitative Reasoning (DQR), and Dialogues of Scientific Literacy (DSL).  At the freshman and sophomore levels, students complete independent dialogues classes, such as DSL 100 and DSL 200.  In their junior and senior years students take classes in their major that carry the themes of the dialogues and therefore double count not only as classes in their major, but also as dialogues classes.  For example, in the College of Business and Management the core classes BUS 322: Business Analytics Using Excel Modeling also counts as a DSL 300 course and BUS 425: Operations Management and Business Process Modeling with Excel counts as a DSL 400 course.

January Term 
All undergraduate day students must also complete the 3 course requirements of the January Term (J-term).  J-term is a 3-week accelerated term where students take only one class, which meets every or almost every day.  The 3 courses required to be completed by students during J-term are Citizenship Project, Language and Culture, and Career Preparation.  Their freshman year students are required to complete Citizenship Project, a course where students design and implement a service learning initiative.  During their remaining J-terms students complete the remaining Language and Culture and Career Preparation courses in any order.  For Language and Culture students may pick from a variety of courses and languages.  These courses focus on a specific geographical region or county in addition to the language of that area.  For career preparation students take a class specific to their major in addition to developing more general skills, like resume writing.  Each of these J-term classes is for 2 credits, in total fulfilling 6 credits towards the student's degree.

Colleges and schools 
 College of Arts and Sciences
 College of Business and Management
Burton D. Morgan College of Aeronautics (The Burton D. Morgan College of Aeronautics is certified by the Federal Aviation Administration as an aviation training center.  It is named in honor of Burton D. Morgan, an entrepreneur).
 Donald E. and Helen L. Ross College of Education
 Eugene M. and Christine E. Lynn College of Communication and Design
Digital Media Arts College
 Lynn University Conservatory of Music

Lynn University Conservatory of Music
Founded in 1992 as the music division of the Harid Conservatory, the Conservatory of Music became part of Lynn University in January 1999.  The conservatory presents more than 50 performances each year.  The Philharmonia orchestra is directed by Guillermo Figueroa.

iPad initiative
In 2013, Lynn launched the iPad mini initiative. This initiative:
Is applicable to all Lynn University students
replaces traditional textbooks and save students hundreds of dollars.
 features Lynn's core curriculum on e-readers enhanced with custom multimedia content.
 provides students with education, productivity, social and news-related iOS apps—some free and some paid for by the university.

In 2016, Lynn elevated the program by providing all undergraduate day students and faculty with an iPad Pro, Apple Pencil and Smart Keyboard.

Athletics

Lynn University's athletic teams are known as the Fighting Knights. The university is an NCAA Division II institution, the college's athletic teams participate in the Sunshine State Conference (SSC). Lynn University teams have won a total of 25 NCAA and NAIA national championships, and 38 Sunshine State Conference championships.  Men's varsity sports are baseball, basketball, golf, lacrosse, soccer, tennis, swimming, cross country and track.  Women's varsity sports include basketball, golf, lacrosse, soccer, softball, swimming, tennis, volleyball, cross country and track. Lynn has rapidly expanded its athletics roster since 2012, adding eight new programs: men's and women's lacrosse, men's and women's swim teams, and men's and women's cross country and track.

Notable alumni
 Joseph AbruzzoDemocratic member of the Florida Senate
 Jean AlexandreProfessional soccer player
 Tal ErelBaseball catcher for the Israel national baseball team
 Kendra ErikaMusician
 Scott GordonProfessional soccer player
 Svetlana Gounkina Russian golfer; multiple Russian national champion; bronze medalist in the World Golfers Championship
 Tommy KahnleProfessional baseball player
 Lisa KerneyFormer ESPN broadcaster
 John McCormackCollege baseball coach at Florida Atlantic
 Tim MeliaProfessional soccer player
 Jared MontzProfessional soccer player
 Melissa OrtizFormer player of Colombia's Women's National Soccer Team
Sherrexcia Rolle Bahamian attorney and VP of operations and General Counsel of Western Air
 Maha HaddiouiProfessional golfer and Olympian from Morocco

References

External links
 Official website
 Official athletics website

 
1962 establishments in Florida
Buildings and structures in Boca Raton, Florida
Educational institutions established in 1962
Former Catholic universities and colleges in the United States
Former women's universities and colleges in the United States
Hospitality schools in the United States
Universities and colleges in Palm Beach County, Florida
Private universities and colleges in Florida